Darius Crosby (ca. 1768  November 18, 1818 Somers, Westchester County, New York) was an American politician from New York.

Life
Crosby was a member of the New York State Assembly (Westchester Co.) in 1811 and 1812.

He was a member of the New York State Senate (Southern D.) from 1814 until his death, sitting in the 38th, 39th, 40th and 41st New York State Legislatures; and was a member of the Council of Appointment in 1816.

He was re-elected in 1818 to another four-year term, but died before the Legislature met for the next session, and was buried at the Presbyterian Cemetery in Somers, NY.

Sources
Death notice at RootsWeb [gives death date Nov. 17, as transcribed from newspaper]
Crosby genealogy at RootsWeb [gives death date Nov. 18, as transcribed from cemetery]
The New York Civil List compiled by Franklin Benjamin Hough (pages 122f, 140, 185f and 268; Weed, Parsons and Co., 1858)

People from Somers, New York
Members of the New York State Assembly
New York (state) state senators
1760s births
1818 deaths
New York (state) Democratic-Republicans